Socialist Party of Catalonia–Congress (PSC–C) was a political party in Catalonia, Spain. PSC–C was founded in 1976 as a continuation of Socialist Convergence of Catalonia (CSC). It also unified with various sectors originating in Workers' Party of Marxist Unification (POUM), Unified Socialist Party of Catalonia (PSUC) and Republican Left of Catalonia (ERC).

Its first secretary was Joan Reventós. Amongst its other leaders were Raimon Obiols, Narcís Serra and Pasqual Maragall, the former president of the Generalitat de Catalunya.

In the General Elections of 1977 PSC–C stood on joint lists with Spanish Socialist Workers' Party (PSOE) as Socialistes de Catalunya. The lists obtained 28.2% of the votes and 15 seats.

In 1978 PSC–C merged with the Catalan Federation of the PSOE and the Socialist Party of Catalonia–Regrouping, forming Socialists' Party of Catalonia (PSC).

PSC-C published L'Hora Socialista and Company.

Electoral performance

Cortes Generales

See also
Socialists' Party of Catalonia
Unified Socialist Party of Catalonia
List of political parties in Catalonia

References

External links
PSC-Congrés sticker

Defunct political parties in Catalonia
Defunct socialist parties in Catalonia